Archbishop Lamy's Chapel, on Bishop's Lodge Rd. in Santa Fe, New Mexico, was built in 1874.  It was listed on the National Register of Historic Places in 1988.

It was built by Archbishop Jean Baptiste Lamy for use as a retreat from his duties as the representative of the  church.

It has adobe walls.

References

National Register of Historic Places in Santa Fe County, New Mexico
Buildings and structures completed in 1874